"Call My Name" is a song by Welsh singer Charlotte Church from her fifth studio album, Tissues and Issues (2005). The song was released as the album's second single on 26 September 2005. It was co-written by Church, Wayne Hector and Eg White; with White producing it alongside Fitzgerald Scott.

Track listing
CD1 single

CD2 single / Australian CD single

UK 12" single

Credits and personnel 
Credits adapted from the liner notes of Tissues and Issues.

 Charlotte Church – lead vocals, songwriting
 Eg White – songwriting, production, drums, percussion, bass synths, guitars, keyboards
 Pete Davis – drums, keyboards
 Wayne Hector – background vocals
 Fitzgerald Scott - production
 Yvonne John-Lewis – background vocals
 Marion Powell – background vocals
 Steve Fitzmaurice – audio engineering
 Stephen Sedgewick – audio engineering

Charts

Weekly charts

References

2005 singles
Charlotte Church songs
Songs written by Wayne Hector
Songs written by Eg White
2005 songs